A farm museum, or museum farm, is a museum based on a historical farm and its buildings, presenting agricultural history. Often the farm is still a working farm, for demonstration and educational purposes.

See List of open-air and living history museums in the United States for a list of such farms in the U.S., or Open-air museum for farms in other countries.

See also
Open-air museum

 
Types of museums